Carl Emil Schorske (March 15, 1915 – September 13, 2015), known professionally as Carl E. Schorske, was an American cultural historian and professor emeritus at Princeton University. In 1981 he won the Pulitzer Prize for General Non-Fiction for his book Fin-de-Siècle Vienna: Politics and Culture (1980), which remains significant to modern European intellectual history. He was a recipient of the first year of MacArthur Fellows Program awards in 1981 and made an honorary citizen of Vienna in 2012.

Biography
Born in the Bronx, New York City, to Theodore Schorske and Gertrude Goldsmith, Schorske received his B.A. from Columbia in 1936 and a Ph.D. from Harvard. He served in the Office of Strategic Services, the precursor to the CIA, during World War II, as chief of political intelligence for Western Europe. His first book, German Social Democracy, published by Harvard University Press in 1955, describes the schism of the Social Democratic Party of Germany into a reformist/constitutionalist right faction and a revolutionary oppositionist left faction during the years 1905–1917.

Following his war-time service, Schorske taught at Wesleyan University (1946–1960), the University of California at Berkeley (1960–1969), and Princeton University (1969 until his retirement in 1980), where he was Dayton-Stockton Professor of History. Professor Schorske was named by Time magazine as one of the nation's ten top academic leaders. In 1987 he delivered the Charles Homer Haskins Lecture. In 1998 Schorske published Thinking With History: Explorations in the Passage to Modernism (Princeton University Press), a collection of essays on Viennese and general history. He turned 100 in March 2015 and died in September at a retirement community in Hightstown, New Jersey.

Decorations and awards
In 2004 Schorske received the Ludwig Wittgenstein Prize of the Austrian Research Association (Österreichische Forschungsgemeinschaft). He was a Corresponding Member of the Austrian Academy of Sciences. On 25 April 2012 Schorske was made an honorary citizen of Vienna during a ceremony attended by his wife, Elizabeth Rorke, his granddaughter, Carina del Valle Schorske, and the mayor of Vienna, Dr Michael Häupl. In 1981 he was a MacArthur Fellow.

 1985: City of Vienna Prize for Journalism
 1996: Grand Silver Medal for Services to the Republic of Austria
 2007: Victor-Adler State Prize for History of Social Movements
 Austrian Decoration for Science and Art

Works
 German Social Democracy, 1905–1917: The Development of the Great Schism (1955, Harvard University Press) 
 Thinking With History: Explorations in the Passage to Modernism (1998, Princeton University Press) 
 Fin-de-Siècle Vienna: Politics and Culture (1980) 
 "A life of learning" Charles Homer Haskins lecture, April 23, 1987 
 Budapest and New York: Studies in Metropolitan Transformation, 1870–1930, with Thomas Bender (1994, Russell Sage Foundation)

References

1915 births
2015 deaths
People from Scarsdale, New York
Harvard University alumni
MacArthur Fellows
People of the Office of Strategic Services
Princeton University faculty
Pulitzer Prize for General Non-Fiction winners
Wesleyan University faculty
Columbia College (New York) alumni
American people of German descent
Members of the Austrian Academy of Sciences
Recipients of the Grand Decoration for Services to the Republic of Austria
Recipients of the Austrian Decoration for Science and Art
20th-century American historians
American male non-fiction writers
Scarsdale High School alumni
American centenarians
Men centenarians
Historians from New York (state)
20th-century American male writers